"Sugar Lips" is a song written by Billy Sherrill and Buddy Killen and was recorded by Al Hirt for his 1964 album, Sugar Lips. The song reached #30 on the Billboard Hot 100 and #3 on the Adult Contemporary chart in 1964.

The song was also featured on Hirt's greatest hits album, The Best of Al Hirt.

In the mid-late 1960s, the song was used as the theme for the TV game show Eye Guess.

References

1964 songs
1964 singles
Songs written by Billy Sherrill
Songs written by Buddy Killen
Al Hirt songs
Song recordings produced by Chet Atkins
RCA Victor singles
Television game show theme songs